This is a complete list of seasons competed by the Calgary Bronks, a Canadian football team.  The team was founded in 1935 of the Alberta Rugby Football Union.  They joined the Western Interprovincial Football Union, in 1936.  They suspended operations in 1941.

See also
Alberta Rugby Football Union champions

Alberta sport-related lists
Calgary-related lists
Canadian Football League lists